Jerome A. Prince (born August 16, 1964) is an American politician serving as the 21st mayor of Gary, Indiana. A member of the Democratic Party, he assumed office on January 1, 2020, succeeding Karen Freeman-Wilson.

Early life 
Prince was born and raised in Gary, Indiana. He graduated from Lew Wallace High School.

Career 
In 1982, Prince enlisted in the United States Marine Corps. In 1986, he returned to Gary and began working in real estate, insurance and retail sales. In 1994, he joined the Calumet Township Assessor's office as a real estate deputy. In 1998, he was elected to the Gary Precinct Committee Organization. In 1999, he was elected to the Gary City Council, representing the fifth district. In 2008, Prince was selected to serve as a member of the Lake County Council after an incumbent member resigned. In 2014, he was elected Lake County Assessor, where he served until 2019.

Mayor of Gary 
Prince was elected mayor of Gary in 2019, defeating incumbent mayor Karen Freeman-Wilson. He assumed office on January 1, 2020. Following the George Floyd protests, Prince pledged to sign an executive order to establish a police reform commission. Prince has advocated for returning manufacturing jobs to Gary. In March 2020, he signed his first executive order, aimed at increasing the hiring of minority, female, and veteran employees by the city government. Prince has also sought to demolish abandoned buildings around Gary as a crime reduction strategy.

References

External links
Office of the Mayor webpage on the City of Gary's website
Mayor Jerome A. Prince's page on Facebook

Living people
1964 births
Mayors of Gary, Indiana
Indiana Democrats
United States Marines
Mayors of places in Indiana
Politicians from Gary, Indiana
African-American mayors in Indiana
21st-century African-American people
20th-century African-American people